Homoeocera modesta is a moth of the subfamily Arctiinae. It is found in Bolivia.

References

Euchromiina
Moths described in 1915